Shiv Gopal Kapoor is the Grayce Wicall Gauthier Chair professor at the University of Illinois at Urbana–Champaign. His interests are manufacturing technologies and material machining. He attended the University of Wisconsin–Madison for his Ph.D. in Mechanical Engineering.

References

External links
 https://web.archive.org/web/20110807215433/http://mechse.illinois.edu/content/directory/faculty/profile.php?user_id=36
 http://www.me.mtu.edu/~jwsuther/uiuc_symp/

Living people
American mechanical engineers
Year of birth missing (living people)